Christine Muhongayire (born 1978) is a Rwandan politician, currently a member of the Chamber of Deputies in the Parliament of Rwanda.

Muhongayire represents the Southern Province and is a member of the Rwandan Patriotic Front. Her district is Nyaruguru District.

Muhongayire is the head of the Committee on Social Affairs in the Chamber of Deputies.

References 

Living people
1978 births
Members of the Chamber of Deputies (Rwanda)
21st-century Rwandan women politicians
21st-century Rwandan politicians